Spodnji Petelinjek is a small settlement east of Blagovica in the Municipality of Lukovica in the eastern part of the Upper Carniola region of Slovenia.

References

External links
 
Spodnji Petelinjek on Geopedia

Populated places in the Municipality of Lukovica